Pseudokerremansia is a genus of beetles in the family Buprestidae, the jewel beetles. They are native to Africa.

Species include:

Pseudokerremansia arcuata (Peringuey, 1908)
Pseudokerremansia zuluensis Bellamy, 2008

References

Buprestidae genera
Beetles of Africa